13 Treasures is a 2009 juvenile fantasy novel written by Michelle Harrison; it is the first entry in the trilogy "The Thirteen Treasures". It features the story of a young girl named Tanya, who has the ability to see mythical creatures.

Awards
13 Treasures won the 2009 Waterstone's Children's Book Prize.

Synopsis
13 Treasures follows its lead character, 13-year-old girl Tanya, who has the rare ability to see and hear the fairies and other creatures who inhabit the woods and many other places. But over the years Tanya has learned to lie about the fairies if something is wrong to anyone, because she has landed herself on a therapist and doctor's couch by this ability.

Tanya summers with her grandmother in Elvesden Manor as a punishment for having another fairy incident in Essex. The manor has been given down to all family members up until now. Fabian, the son of Warwick also lives in Elvesden Manor, and with Warwick's father, Amos. Amos has been under suspicion for the 5 decade old disappearance of a young girl named Morwenna Bloom in the nearby woods. He was the last person to see her.

At first, Tanya and Fabian are unsympathetic to each other, but as they spend time together they start becoming friends. In Tickey End - the local village - Tanya meets the reclusive 'witch', Mad Morag, who gives her an old compass. Tanya finds a unique silver bracelet while cleaning out an old library one day. On this bracelet there are thirteen charms. She also finds newspaper clippings about a girl named Morwenna Bloom who mysteriously disappeared 50 years ago. As Tanya and Fabian team up, and they decide to investigate this disappearance and to prove that Fabian's grandfather, Amos, is innocent. Tanya also finds and befriends a girl named Red (or Rowan) who saves changelings, or fairy babies exchanged with human babies, from dying in a hospital because their disguise spells wear off and they are killed for their looks. It is revealed that one can only have the "second sight" of being able to see fairies by having a changeling in their family. The changeling in Tanya's family turns out to be Elizabeth Elvesden.

Tanya, Red, and Fabian go out into the woods following Morwenna's hidden instructions in a poem, but it turns out Morwenna went into the fairy world 50 years ago and now wants to come back. The reason Tanya's grandmother doesn't like Morwenna is because Tanya's grandmother (Florence) almost went into the fairy world herself, but didn't at the last second. Morwenna thought critically of her for that and threatened to take Tanya's mom into the fairy world. However, Florence tricked her into giving her 28 more years. Now Morwenna wants Tanya.

Bound in vines at midnight, Red causes a distraction and Tanya's dog eats Morwenna's fairy, Feathercap. Red immediately starts to work on cutting the vines, but realizes it is too late. Meanwhile, Fabian runs back to the house to find Morwenna's lock of hair in the human world that is keeping her from aging. It turns out Amos loved Morwenna and blames himself for her disappearance. It is also revealed that Warwick is a fairy hunter who took a special potion to be able to see fairies. Fabian and Warwick take the hair to the middle of the forest and burn it. As Tanya is about to get dragged into the fairy world, Red cuts her own hand and the vines take her instead. Tanya goes back to the mansion, but sees Morwenna on the way. Having her lock of hair destroyed, Morwenna suddenly ages 50 years and the shock kills her. Morag finds her the next morning dead from heart failure.  Tanya returns to the mansion and talks with her grandmother, and they forgive each other.

References

External links
  About the book

Children's fantasy novels
2009 American novels
2009 fantasy novels
American children's novels
2009 children's books